Coleus unguentarius, synonym Plectranthus unguentarius, is a species of flowering plant in the family Lamiaceae. It is found only in Namibia. Its natural habitat is rocky areas. It is threatened by habitat loss.

References

unguentarius
Endemic flora of Namibia
Vulnerable plants
Taxonomy articles created by Polbot
Taxobox binomials not recognized by IUCN